Australian singer and actress Jessica Mauboy has released one video album and appeared in thirty music videos, two films, and many television programs and commercials. After she became the runner-up on the fourth season of Australian Idol in 2006, Mauboy signed a recording contract with Sony Music Australia. In 2008, she released her debut studio album Been Waiting and six music videos for its singles were shot. Mauboy's first music video was for the album's lead single "Running Back" featuring American rapper Flo Rida. It was directed by Fin Edquist and portrayed a fictional relationship between Mauboy and Flo Rida. At the 2009 MTV Australia Awards, the video was nominated for Best Collaboration. Keir McFarlane directed the music videos for the following singles, "Burn" and the title track "Been Waiting". The music video for the fifth single "Up/Down" was directed by Sequoia and shot in Los Angeles.

In 2010, Mauboy made her acting debut in the musical comedy-drama film Bran Nue Dae alongside Missy Higgins and Geoffrey Rush. The film received mixed reviews from critics, despite its box office success in Australia. That same year, Mauboy released her second studio album Get 'Em Girls and five music videos for its singles were shot. American director Hype Williams directed the music videos for the title track "Get 'Em Girls" and "Saturday Night" which were both filmed in Los Angeles. The video for "Get 'Em Girls", which featured Mauboy strutting the catwalk and modelling a variety of looks, was heavily criticised by fans on YouTube who described it as "cheap", "tacky" and "disappointing". American rapper Snoop Dogg's appearance in the video was described by some fans as "hypersexual" and "sleazy". The music videos for the album's following singles "What Happened to Us" and "Inescapable" were directed by Mark Alston, who previously directed the video for Mauboy's 2009 single "Let Me Be Me". In 2012, Mauboy starred alongside Chris O'Dowd in the musical film The Sapphires, which earned her the AACTA Award for Best Actress in a Supporting Role. The film received positive reviews from critics and was a box office success in Australia.

The music video for "Never Be the Same", the fourth single from her third studio album Beautiful (2013), was directed by Lawrence Lim and featured Australian actress Miah Madden playing a younger version of Mauboy. It was nominated for Best Video at the 2014 ARIA Music Awards. The music video for the fifth single "Can I Get a Moment?" received mixed opinions from fans on YouTube and Twitter who complained about Mauboy's outfits and the video's budget. Nick Waterman directed the music video for the album's next single "The Day Before I Met You", which was shot in Mauboy's hometown of Darwin. It featured appearances by her parents, sisters and grandmother, as well as children from the Aboriginal communities of Kulaluk and Bagot. Mauboy was cast in the lead role of the television drama series The Secret Daughter, which premiered on the Seven Network on 3 October 2016. It was Mauboy's first major TV role and was written especially for her. The role earned Mauboy her first Logie Award nomination for Best Actress, and the show was renewed for a second and final season in 2017.

Music videos

Guest appearances

Video albums

Films

Television

Commercials

See also
Jessica Mauboy discography

References

External links
Jessica Mauboy's official Vevo channel on YouTube

Videographies of Australian artists
Actress filmographies
Australian filmographies